Elections are held in the U.S. state of South Dakota regularly.

In a 2020 study, South Dakota was ranked as the 22nd hardest state for citizens to vote in.

Gubernatorial elections 
The Governor of South Dakota is elected every 4 years. Kristi Noem was elected in the 2018 gubernatorial election.

See also 
 United States presidential elections in South Dakota
Women's suffrage in South Dakota
 Elections in the United States

References

External links
 

South Dakota elections
Government of South Dakota
Events in South Dakota